Bodianus mesothorax, the split-level hogfish, blackbelt hogfish, black-belt hogfish, coral hogfish, eclipse hogfish, eclipse pigfish, mesothorax hogfish or yellow-spotted hogfish, is a species of wrasse native to the western Pacific Ocean and the eastern Indian Ocean.

Description
Bodianus mesothoraxwhich has a distinct blackish diagonal band between the purplish head end of the body and the whitish to yellowish posterior part. The juveniles are dark purple with two lines of bright yellow spots. They are similar to the juveniles of the axilspot hogfish (Bodianus axillaris) although these have white rather than yellow spots. They take only a few weeks to change completely and intermediate fish are very rarely recorded. The adults are distinguished from the adults of the axilspot hogfish by the dark diagonal band and the lack of spots on the dorsal fin and the anal fin.

Distribution
Bodianus mesothorax is found in the eastern Indian Ocean as far west as the Nicobar Islands in the Andaman Sea and in the western Pacific Ocean from Japan I the north and Australia in the south as far east as Fiji.

Habitat and biology
Juveniles inhabit caves in the reef. Adults of this species clean other fish by eating parasites on the body of other reef fish.

In the aquarium
This species can be found in the aquarium trade. It is commonly imported for the fish trade from the Philippines and Indonesia.

References

External links
 

Fish of Thailand
mesothorax
Taxa named by Marcus Elieser Bloch
Taxa named by Johann Gottlob Theaenus Schneider
Fish described in 1801